Robert Conrad Hahn (1921-1996) was an American lawyer and politician who was a member of the Massachusetts House of Representatives from 1961 to 1965 and Chairman of the Massachusetts Republican State Committee from 1971 to 1972.

Hahn represented the 5th Norfolk District in the Massachusetts House of Representatives from 1961 to 1965. In 1964 he was the Republican nominee for Treasurer and Receiver-General of Massachusetts. He ran for Massachusetts Attorney General in 1966, but dropped out of the race before the Republican primary.

Hahn was elected Chairman of the Republican State Committee on November 22, 1971. He lost his chairmanship on May 25, 1972 amid allegations that he was being investigated by the State Attorney General's office for fraud.

Hahn was indicted on June 16, 1972 on the charge of conspiracy to commit larceny. He was acquitted by a jury and later sued former Governor Francis W. Sargent, former Attorney General Robert H. Quinn, former State Insurance Commissioner John G. Ryan, and former Secretary of Consumer Affairs William Cowin. Hahn alleged that the defendants had violated his rights under the Civil Rights Act of 1871 when they "perjured themselves, suborned perjury, suppressed evidence and manipulated administrative processes in an effort to destroy appellant's political career by generating adverse publicity and procuring his indictment." Three of the charges were dismissed and a summary judgment in favor of the defendants was issued on the fourth.

References

1921 births
1996 deaths
Northeastern University alumni
Boston University School of Law alumni
Tufts University alumni
Massachusetts lawyers
Massachusetts Republican Party chairs
People from Norfolk County, Massachusetts
Republican Party members of the Massachusetts House of Representatives
20th-century American politicians
People from Jamaica Plain
20th-century American lawyers